The 1901–02 season was Newton Heath's tenth season in the Football League and their eighth in the Second Division. They finished 15th in the league, avoiding relegation by only five points. In the FA Cup, the Heathens were knocked out by Lincoln City, losing 2–1 in the Intermediate Round.

The club also entered teams in the Lancashire and Manchester Senior Cups in 1901–02. They only managed to reach the second round of the Lancashire Cup, before losing 5–0 to Southport Central, but the real success came in the Manchester Cup, in which they beat Bolton Wanderers after a replay in the semi-final, before beating Manchester City 2–1 in the final.

The season marked also the final season for the club under its original name Newton Heath. The club had been struggling financially during the season, and were taken to court by their president, William Healey, over a sum of £242 17s 10d owed to him by the club in January 1902. Unable to pay, as they were £2,600 in debt, the club was declared bankrupt. Two months later, club captain Harry Stafford managed to enlist the help of Manchester brewer John Henry Davies, who, in conjunction with three other local businessmen, invested a total of £2,000 in the club. Davies was installed as club president and the club was renamed "Manchester United".

Second Division

FA Cup

Manchester United F.C. seasons
Newton Heath